Viljo Punkari (3 October 1934 – 15 November 1964) was a Finnish wrestler. He competed at the 1956 Summer Olympics and the 1960 Summer Olympics.

References

External links
 

1934 births
1964 deaths
Finnish male sport wrestlers
Olympic wrestlers of Finland
Wrestlers at the 1956 Summer Olympics
Wrestlers at the 1960 Summer Olympics
People from Seinäjoki
Sportspeople from South Ostrobothnia